Durlas Óg GAA is a juvenile Tipperary GAA club which is located in Thurles, County Tipperary, in Ireland. The club field teams at under 12, under 14, and under 16 age groups and their home pitch is Páirc na nÓg in Thurles.

References

External links
Official Site
GAA Info Page
Tipperary GAA site

Gaelic games clubs in County Tipperary